Miquelon also known as , is one of the islands of the archipelago of Saint Pierre and Miquelon, an Overseas collectivity of France located in the Gulf of St. Lawrence in the Atlantic Ocean,  south of the coast of Newfoundland. Miquelon is situated between Le Cap Island to the north and Langlade Island (also called Petite Miquelon) to the south.

Toponymy 
The name Miquelon purportedly derived from a Basque nickname for "Michael" (Mikel). In 1579, the names Micquetõ and Micquelle appeared for the first time in French Basque mariner Martin de Hoyarçabal's maritime pilot. The name evolved over time into Miclon, Micklon, and finally Miquelon (Mikelune in Basque).

Geography

Its geology consists of slightly metamorphosed post-Ordovician volcanic rocks, mainly rhyolites with breccias, andesites and basalts. On the south of the Miquelon Island is the Grand Barachois, a large lagoon which is host to a large population of seals and other wildlife. Miquelon is also a well known destination for bird watching.

The island of Saint Pierre Island is across a treacherous and foggy  strait that fishermen named "The Mouth of Hell" that has been the site of more than 600 shipwrecks.

Climate

The climate is typical of the North Atlantic and the Labrador Current, with frequent storms and winds that exceed  for nearly six months of the year. The summers are cool and foggy.

Population

Miquelon includes the commune of Miquelon-Langlade, with a population of 626 in 2012.  Miquelon Airport serves the population via turboprop or small jet aircraft. The majority of the residents live in the town also called Miquelon, located in the north of the island near La Cap. The residents are known as Miquelonnais and are citizens of France.

Gallery

See also
History of Saint Pierre and Miquelon
List of islands of France
List of islands in the Atlantic Ocean

References

External links 

 

Saint Pierre and Miquelon
Islands of the North Atlantic Ocean
Islands of France